Clayton is a city in Clayton County, Iowa, United States. The population was 45 at the 2020 census, down from 55 in 2000. Clayton is located directly on the Mississippi River and is only accessible via a very steep road.

History
Clayton was founded in 1849.

Geography
Clayton is located at  (42.902929, -91.148165).

Demographics

2010 census
As of the census of 2010, there were 43 people, 28 households, and 14 families living in the city. The racial makeup of the city was 100.0% White.

There were 28 households, of which 3.6% had children under the age of 18 living with them, 42.9% were married couples living together, 7.1% had a male householder with no wife present, and 50.0% were non-families. 50.0% of all households were made up of individuals, and 14.2% had someone living alone who was 65 years of age or older. The average household size was 1.54 and the average family size was 2.07.

The median age in the city was 59.3 years. 2.3% of residents were under the age of 18; 0% were between the ages of 18 and 24; 13.9% were from 25 to 44; 51.2% were from 45 to 64; and 32.6% were 65 years of age or older. The gender makeup of the city was 46.5% male and 53.5% female.

2000 census
As of the census of 2000, there were 55 people, 32 households, and 19 families living in the city. The racial makeup of the city was 100.00% White.

There were 32 households, out of which 9.4% had children under the age of 18 living with them, 53.1% were married couples living together, 3.1% had a female householder with no husband present, and 40.6% were non-families. 40.6% of all households were made up of individuals, and 21.9% had someone living alone who was 65 years of age or older. The average household size was 1.72 and the average family size was 2.11.

In the city, the population was spread out, with 5.5% under the age of 18, 1.8% from 18 to 24, 7.3% from 25 to 44, 56.4% from 45 to 64, and 29.1% who were 65 years of age or older. The median age was 56 years. For every 100 females, there were 89.7 males. For every 100 females age 18 and over, there were 92.6 males.

The median income for a household in the city was $31,250, and the median income for a family was $40,833. Males had a median income of $30,625 versus $40,625 for females. The per capita income for the city was $21,214. None of the population and none of the families were below the poverty line.

Education
Public schools are operated by the Clayton Ridge Community School District, which formed in 2005 in the merger of the Guttenberg Community School District and the Garnavillo Community School District. Students were previously zoned to Garnavillo schools.

References

Cities in Iowa
Iowa populated places on the Mississippi River
Cities in Clayton County, Iowa
1849 establishments in Iowa
Populated places established in 1849